is a passenger railway station  located in the town of  Kotoura, Tottori Prefecture, Japan. It is operated by the West Japan Railway Company (JR West).

Lines

Station layout
The station consists of one ground-level island platform and one ground level side platform connected by a level crossing to the station building. The station is unattended.

Platforms

Adjacent stations
West Japan Railway Company (JR West)

History
Akasaki Station opened on August 28, 1903. With the privatization of the Japan National Railways (JNR) on April 1, 1987, the station came under the aegis of the West Japan Railway Company.

Passenger statistics
In fiscal 2018, the station was used by an average of 642 passengers daily.

Surrounding area
Kotoura Town Hall Branch Office
Kotoura Municipal Akasaki Junior High School
Tottori Prefectural Kotonoura High School for Special Needs Education

See also
List of railway stations in Japan

References

External links 

 Akasaki Station from JR-Odekake.net 

Railway stations in Tottori Prefecture
Stations of West Japan Railway Company
Sanin Main Line
Railway stations in Japan opened in 1903
Kotoura, Tottori